Karl David Wilhelm Mayer-Eymar (29 July 1826 – 25 February 1907) was a Franco-Swiss paleontologist and geologist known for his work on classifying the stratigraphy of the Tertiary into 12 stages. He was born Karl Mayer but added the anagram Eymar around 1865 to distinguish his name from others, and the nickname "Tertiary Mayer" was also used. He was a major collector of fossils and described many molluscs.

Son of a Swiss businessman Carl Friederich Mayer and Elisabeth Maria Fraziska Kunkler, he was born in Marseilles and was educated at Renne and St Gall before going to the University of Zurich in 1846. He then worked at the Museum d'Histoire Naturelle at Paris under Charles Henry Dessalines d'Orbigny. He moved to the Zurich Polytechnische Hochschule in 1858 and became a curator of the collections, becoming a professor in 1875. In 1857 he published his most influential work Versuch einer neuen Klassifikation der Tertiär-Gebilde Europas (An Attempt at a New Classification of the Tertiary Formations of Europe) in which he classified the European Tertiary into 12 stages of which the Bartonian, Aquitanian, Tortonian, Astian, and Piacenzian still continue to be in use. His collections are held in ETH-Zurich.

References

External links 
 Karl Mayer-Eymar and Barton-On-Sea
 ETH collections

1826 births
1907 deaths
19th-century Swiss geologists
Scientists from Marseille